The Clermont Woman's Club is a historic woman's club in Clermont, Florida, United States. It was organized in 1921. 

The club is housed in an 1880s former one-room schoolhouse located at 655 Broome Street. On January 7, 1993, the building was added to the U.S. National Register of Historic Places.

See also
List of Registered Historic Woman's Clubhouses in Florida

References

External links
 Lake County listings at National Register of Historic Places
 Florida's Office of Cultural and Historical Programs
 Lake County listings
 Clermont Women's Club

National Register of Historic Places in Lake County, Florida
Women's clubs in Florida
Women's club buildings in Florida
Clermont, Florida